Rahimabad (also Romanized as Raḩīmābād; also known as Rahim Abad Bahabad) is a village in Jolgeh Rural District, in the Central District of Behabad County, Yazd Province, Iran. At the 2006 census, its population was 106, in 23 families.

References 

Populated places in Behabad County